Shri Raj Mohinder Singh Majitha is an Indian politician. He is from the Shiromani Akali Dal party and was a Member of the Parliament of India representing Punjab in the Rajya Sabha, the upper house of the Indian Parliament.

References

Shiromani Akali Dal politicians
Rajya Sabha members from Punjab, India
Living people
Year of birth missing (living people)
Punjab, India MLAs 1997–2002